Saifud-Din Chaudhury (also known as Dr. S.D. Chowdhury) (October 1917 – 1997) was a Bangladeshi economic botanist, policy planner and university academic. He was a former Vice-chancellor of East Pakistan Agricultural University (later Bangladesh Agricultural University). He was a foundation fellow of Bangladesh Academy of Sciences since 1973. He also served as the president of the academy.

Education

Chaudhury was a student of Government College, Lahore. He completed his bachelor's from Presidency College, Calcutta. He obtained his Ph.D. from the Imperial College of London. He then conducted research on plant breeding at the Beltsville Research Institute in the United States.

Career
Chaudhury served as an economic botanist to the Government of Assam and the Government of East Pakistan. He then became the director of Jute Research Institute and Agriculture of East Pakistan.

Chaudhury was appointed a member of Planning Commission of the Government of Bangladesh in 1977.
He also served as the president of Bangladesh Academy of Sciences

Personal life
Dr. Chowdhury was the son of Khan Bahadur Mahmud Chowdhuri and was from Rankeli, Golapgonj, Sylhet. He was the eldest of four brothers

Awards

 Tamgha-e-Imtiaz
 Sitara-e-Quaid-e-Azam
 Lions Gold Medal by Sylhet Lions Club

References

1917 births
1997 deaths
Government College University, Lahore alumni
Pakistani botanists
Pakistani expatriates in the United Kingdom
Pakistani expatriates in the United States
Presidency University, Kolkata alumni
Alumni of Imperial College London
Bangladeshi botanists
Vice-Chancellors of Bangladesh Agricultural University
Fellows of Bangladesh Academy of Sciences